Ian J Lawson (born 4 March 1977) is a British rower. He competed in the men's single sculls event at the 2004 Summer Olympics. 

Lawson graduated from Durham University in 1998. He was a product of the high performance programme at Durham University Boat Club.

References

External links
 

1977 births
Living people
British male rowers
Olympic rowers of Great Britain
Rowers at the 2004 Summer Olympics
Sportspeople from Bradford
Durham University Boat Club rowers
Alumni of St Cuthbert's Society, Durham